Janequeo is a female Mapudungun name and the name of a famous woman who defeated the Spaniards during the Arauco War. Several ships of the Chilean Navy have been named Janequeo

 Janequeo (1836), ex-brigantine Isaac Macen
 Janequeo (1879), torpedo boat sunk off Callao
 Janequeo (1881) torpedo boat to replace the 1879 boat lost off Callao
 Janequeo (1929) ATA-70, a tug 
 Janequeo (1974), a tug
 Janequeo (2016) ATF-65, an anchor handling tug supply vessel

Citations

Janequeo, Chilean ship